Culross (/ˈkurəs/) (Scottish Gaelic: Cuileann Ros, 'holly point or promontory') is a village and former royal burgh, and parish, in Fife, Scotland.

According to the 2006 estimate, the village has a population of 395. Originally, Culross served as a port city on the Firth of Forth and is believed to have been founded by Saint Serf during the 6th century.

The civil parish had a population of 4,348 in 2011.

Founding legend
A legend states that when the Brittonic princess (and future saint) Teneu, daughter of the king of Lothian, became pregnant before marriage, her family threw her from a cliff. She survived the fall unharmed, and was soon met by an unmanned boat. She knew she had no home to go to, so she got into the boat; it sailed her across the Firth of Forth to land at Culross where she was cared for by Saint Serf; he became foster-father of her son, Saint Kentigern or Mungo.

West Kirk and Abbey

The parish appears to have originally centred further west. The original church, later known as the "West Kirk" perhaps dates to the 11th century but was abandoned around 1500 and therefore did not come into play in 1560 at the time of the Reformation. However, it continued to be used for burials into the 20th century, being a long-established burial ground.

Meanwhile the Cistercian Abbey dedicated to the Virgin Mary and St. Serf was built around a mile to the east in 1217, being founded by Malcolm, Earl of Fife. Part of this became the parish church in 1560 and was restored in 1905. A Chapel of St. Mungo (now wholly lost) was erected in 1503 by Robert Blackadder, Archbishop of Glasgow.

The first recorded minister was John Dykes (1567), He was replaced by Robert Colville of Linlithgow in 1593 who ministered until 1629 when replaced by his assistant Robert Melville. John Duncan MA took over in 1632. Duncan was pensioned off in 1642 but is recorded as joining the camp of General Leslie at Newcastle 1646/7 during the English Civil War.

In the 17th century its most famous minister was the Covenanter James Fraser of Brea who took over in 1689.

Industry

During the 16th and 17th centuries, the town was a centre of the coal mining industry. Sir George Bruce of Carnock, who built the splendid 'Palace' of Culross and whose elaborate family monument stands in the north transept of the Abbey church, established a coal mine at Culross in 1575. In 1595 he constructed the Moat Pit, the first coal mine in the world to extend under the sea. The mine worked what is now known as the Upper Hirst coal seam, with ingenious contrivances to drain the constant leakage from above. This mine was considered one of the marvels of the British Isles in the early 17th century, described by one visitor, John Taylor, The Water Poet, as "a wonder ... an unfellowed and unmatchable work", until the Moat Pit was destroyed in a storm on 30 March 1625.

Culross' secondary industry was salt panning. There was a considerable export trade by sea in the produce of these industries and the prevalence of red roof tiles in Culross and other villages in Fife is thought to be a direct result of collier ships returning to Culross with Dutch roof tiles as ballast. The town was also known for its monopoly on the manufacture of 'girdles', i.e. flat iron plates for baking over an open fire.

In the late 18th century, Archibald Cochrane, 9th Earl of Dundonald established kilns for extracting coal tar using his patented method.

The town's role as a port declined from the 18th century, and by Victorian times it had become something of a ghost town. The harbour was filled in and the sea cut off by the coastal railway line in the second half of the 19th century. The outer harbour has recently been the subject of restoration work.

Heritage

Notable buildings in the burgh include Culross Town House, formerly used as a courthouse and prison, the 16th century Culross Palace, 17th century Study, and the remains of the Cistercian house of Culross Abbey, founded 1217. The tower, transepts and choir of the Abbey Church remain in use as the parish church, while the ruined claustral buildings are cared for by Historic Environment Scotland.

The West Kirk fell out of use before 1633 when it was noted as no longer serving as the parish church. The West Kirk was also the site where four women executed for witchcraft in 1675 were alleged to have congregated.

Just outside the town is the 18th-century Dunimarle Castle, built by the Erskine family to supersede a medieval castle.

Thomas Cochrane, 10th Earl of Dundonald spent much of his early life in Culross, where his family had an estate. A bust in his honour by Scott Sutherland can be seen outside the Culross Town House. He was the first Vice Admiral of Chile.

The war memorial was erected in 1921 to a design by Sir Robert Lorimer.

During the 20th century, it became recognised that Culross contained many unique historical buildings and the National Trust for Scotland has been working on their preservation and restoration since the 1930s.

Administration
Prior to the 1890s, the parish of Culross formed an exclave of Perthshire. It is within the Dunfermline and West Fife Westminster Parliamentary constituency.

Culross as a location for filming
Several motion pictures have used Culross as a filming location, including Kidnapped (1971), The Little Vampire (2000), A Dying Breed (2007), The 39 Steps (2008), and Captain America: The First Avenger (2011). In September 2013, the Starz television series, Outlander, started filming in Culross for its premiere in August 2014.

Notable people

 George Bruce of Carnock (1550-1625), Lord Bruce
 Christian Cavendish, Countess of Devonshire, (1595-1675), daughter of Edward Bruce, 1st Lord Kinloss (1548-1611), owner of Culross Abbey House.
 Thomas Cochrane (1775–1860), naval officer, mercenary and politician, spent much of his early life in Culross, where his family had an estate.
 Bishop Leighton, Archbishop of Glasgow
 Elizabeth Melville, "Lady Culross" (c.1578 - c.1640), Scotland's earliest known published female poet
 Stewart McPherson (1822-1892), recipient of the Victoria Cross
 Rev Robert Pont (1525-1606) radical church figure during the Reformation, five times Moderator of the Church of Scotland
 Gilbert Primrose (d. 1616) surgeon to James VI
 Jackie Sinclair (1943-2010), Scottish international footballer

Twin towns and sister cities
Culross is twinned with Veere in the Netherlands, which was formerly the port through which its export goods entered the Low Countries.

References

External links

 Culross community site at Fife Council
 Entry in A Topographical Dictionary of Scotland (1846)
 Culross Arts and Music Festival
 Engraving of Culross in 1693 by John Slezer at National Library of Scotland

 
Villages in Fife
Ports and harbours of Scotland
Royal burghs
National Trust for Scotland properties
Parishes in Fife
Mining communities in Fife